Theater of Salvation is the fourth (or third "official") studio album by German heavy metal band Edguy, released in 1999. It is the first to feature drummer Felix Bohnke and bass player Tobias Exxel. The album reached No. 50 in the Swedish Albums Chart.

Track listing
All music by Tobias Sammet, except where indicated. All lyrics by Sammet.

 "The Healing Vision" - 1:11
 "Babylon" - 6:09
 "The Headless Game" - 5:31
 "Land of the Miracle" - 6:32
 "Wake up the King" - 5:43
 "Falling Down" - 4:35
 "Arrows Fly" (Sammet, Jens Ludwig) - 5:03
 "Holy Shadows" - 4:30
 "Another Time" - 4:07
 "The Unbeliever" (Sammet, Ludwig) - 5:47
 "Theater of Salvation" - 12:25

Japanese edition bonus tracks
"For a Trace of Life" - 4:13
 "Walk on Fighting" (live) - 5:40
 "Fairytale" (live) - 6:22

Personnel
Band members
Tobias Sammet - lead and backing vocals, keyboards
Jens Ludwig - guitar, backing vocals
Dirk Sauer - guitar, backing vocals
Tobias 'Eggi' Exxel - bass guitar
Felix Bohnke - drums

Additional musicians
Frank Tischer - piano and keyboards
Daniel Gallmarini - piano on track 9
Markus Schmitt, Ralf Zdiarstek, Mark Laukel, Uwe Ruppel, Timo Ruppel - backing vocals

Production
Norman Meiritz, Frank Tischer - engineers
Mikko Karmila - mixing
Bernd Steinwedel - mastering
Adrian Maleska - cover art

References

Edguy albums
1999 albums
AFM Records albums